is a brewery in Ertvelde, East Flanders, Belgium.

Beers 
 Augustijn
 Bornem Blonde
 Bornem Double
 Bornem Triple
 Celis White
 Gulden Draak (Dutch for Gilded Dragon) (10.5% ABV)
 Gulden Draak 9000 Quadruple (10.70%)
 Leute Bokbier
 Piraat, pale ale with an ABV of 10.5%.
 Principale Bruin

References

External links 
 

1784 establishments in Europe
Van Steenberge
Companies based in East Flanders
Evergem